Amblyseius foenalis is a species of mite in the family Phytoseiidae.

References

foenalis
Articles created by Qbugbot
Animals described in 1914